The State Register of Heritage Places is maintained by the Heritage Council of Western Australia. , 641 places are heritage-listed in the City of Stirling, of which 20 are on the State Register of Heritage Places.

List
The Western Australian State Register of Heritage Places, lists the following 20 state registered places within the City of Stirling:

References

Stirling